Julian Rullier (born 4 April 1990) is a French footballer.

Started at As Monaco academy, He played in Latvia, Lithuania and Greece before having two spells in the Ukrainian Premier League. In between he also played for Nybergsund on the Norwegian fourth tier.

References

1990 births
Living people
French footballers
Association football midfielders
FC Tranzīts players
FK Atlantas players
Rouf F.C. players
FC Zirka Kropyvnytskyi players
Nybergsund IL players
FC Volyn Lutsk players
Elverum Fotball players
French expatriate footballers
Expatriate footballers in Latvia
French expatriate sportspeople in Latvia
Expatriate footballers in Greece
French expatriate sportspeople in Greece
Expatriate footballers in Lithuania
French expatriate sportspeople in Lithuania
Expatriate footballers in Ukraine
French expatriate sportspeople in Ukraine
Expatriate footballers in Norway
French expatriate sportspeople in Norway
Latvian Higher League players
Gamma Ethniki players
A Lyga players
Ukrainian Premier League players
Ukrainian First League players